The enzyme threo-3-hydroxyaspartate ammonia-lyase (EC 4.3.1.16) is an enzyme that catalyzes the chemical reaction

threo-3-hydroxy-L-aspartate  oxaloacetate + NH3

Nomenclature 

This enzyme belongs to the family of lyases, specifically ammonia lyases, which cleave carbon-nitrogen bonds.  The systematic name of this enzyme class is ''threo-3-hydroxy-L-aspartate ammonia-lyase (oxaloacetate-forming). Other names in common use include threo-3-hydroxyaspartate dehydratase, L-threo-3-hydroxyaspartate dehydratase, and threo''-3-hydroxy-L-aspartate ammonia-lyase.

References 

 

EC 4.3.1
Enzymes of unknown structure